Heydarabad (also Romanized as Ḩeydarābād) is a village in Khaveh-ye Jonubi Rural District, in the Central District of Delfan County, Lorestan Province, Iran. At the 2006 census, its population was 34, in 8 families.

References 

Towns and villages in Delfan County